William Moser may refer to:
 William H. Moser (born 1964), American diplomat
 William R. Moser (1927–2003), American lawyer and judge in Wisconsin